David Kent Harrison (6 April 1931, Massachusetts – 21 December 1999, Barnstable, Massachusetts) was an American mathematician, specializing in algebra, particularly homological algebra and valuation theory.

He completed his Ph.D. at Princeton University in 1957; his dissertation, titled On torsion free abelian groups, was written under the supervision of Emil Artin.

Harrison was a faculty member from 1959 to 1963 at the University of Pennsylvania and from 1963 to 1993 at the University of Oregon, retiring there as professor emeritus in 1993.

He developed a commutative cohomology theory for commutative algebras. Along with his colleague Marie A. Vitulli, he developed a unified valuation theory for rings with zero divisors that generalized both Krull and Archimedean valuations.

He was a Guggenheim Fellow for the academic year 1963–1964. He supervised 28 doctoral students including Joel Cunningham. Ann Hill Harrison endowed the Harrison Memory Award for outstanding mathematical students at the University of Oregon. He is survived by his son, composer and pianist Michael Harrison, a Guggenheim Fellow for the academic year 2018–2019, and his daughter Jo Ellen Harrison.

Selected publications
 
 
 with J. M. Irwin, C. L. Peercy, and E. A. Walker: 
 
 
 with Stephen U. Chase and Alex F. T. W. Rosenberg: 
 
 with Joel Cunningham: 
 with Hoyt D. Warner: 
 
 
 
 
 with Cornelius Greither: 
 with Bodo Pareigis: 
 with M. A. Vitulli: 
 with Frank DeMeyer and Rick Miranda: 
 with C. Greither:

References

External links
 (1955 photograph of, left to right, Charles W. Misner, Hale Trotter, Niels Bohr, Hugh Everett III, and David Harrison)
 David K. Harrisons's Author Profile Page on MathSciNet

1931 births
1999 deaths
20th-century American mathematicians
Algebraists
Mathematicians from Massachusetts
Princeton University alumni
University of Oregon faculty